Jasper County is the southernmost county in the U.S. state of South Carolina. As of the 2020 census, the population was 28,791. Its county seat is Ridgeland and its largest city is Hardeeville. The county was formed in 1912 from portions of Hampton County and Beaufort County.

Jasper County is included in the Hilton Head Island–Bluffton, SC Metropolitan Statistical Area. It is located in the Lowcountry region of the state. For several decades, in contrast to neighboring Beaufort County, Jasper was one of the poorest counties in the state.  Recent development from 2000 onwards has given the county new residents, expanded business opportunities, and a wealthier tax base.

History 
The county was founded in 1912 and was named after William Jasper. The county seat is Ridgeland while the largest city is Hardeeville, the county is also in the Hilton Head Island-Bluffton-Beaufort Metropolitan Area.

Geography

National protected areas
 Savannah National Wildlife Refuge (part)
 Tybee National Wildlife Refuge

State and local protected areas/sites 
 Frampton Plantation House
 Kingfisher Pond Recreation Area
 Old House Plantation

Major water bodies 
 Atlantic Ocean
 Intracoastal Waterway
 Okatee River
 Savannah River
 Tulifiny River

Adjacent counties
 Hampton County - north
 Beaufort County - east
 Chatham County, Georgia - south
 Effingham County, Georgia - west

Major highways

Demographics

2020 census

As of the 2020 United States census, there were 28,791 people, 10,269 households, and 7,298 families residing in the county.

2010 census
As of the 2010 United States Census, there were 24,777 people, 8,517 households, and 5,944 families living in the county. The racial makeup of the county was 46.0% black or African American, 43.0% white, 0.7% Asian, 0.5% American Indian, 0.1% Pacific islander, 8.3% from other races, and 1.4% from two or more races. Those of Hispanic or Latino origin made up 15.1% of the population. In terms of ancestry, 7.1% were Irish, and 2.5% were American.

Of the 8,517 households, 36.9% had children under the age of 18 living with them, 44.2% were married couples living together, 18.6% had a female householder with no husband present, 30.2% were non-families, and 24.8% of all households were made up of individuals. The average household size was 2.73 and the average family size was 3.23. The median age was 34.6 years.

The median income for a household in the county was $37,393 and the median income for a family was $45,800. Males had a median income of $31,999 versus $24,859 for females. The per capita income for the county was $17,997. About 14.2% of families and 21.5% of the population were below the poverty line, including 32.2% of those under age 18 and 14.5% of those age 65 or over.

2000 census
As of the census of 2000, there were 20,678 people, 7,042 households, and 5,091 families living in the county.  The population density was 32 people per square mile (12/km2).  There were 7,928 housing units at an average density of 12 per square mile (5/km2).  The racial makeup of the county was 52.69% Black or African American, 42.39% White, 0.37% Native American, 0.44% Asian, 0.05% Pacific Islander, 3.39% from other races, and 0.67% from two or more races.  5.75% of the population were Hispanic or Latino of any race.

There were 7,042 households, out of which 34.5% had children under the age of 18 living with them, 48.1% were married couples living together, 18.2% had a female householder with no husband present, and 27.7% were non-families. 23.2% of all households were made up of individuals, and 8.8% had someone living alone who was 65 years of age or older.  The average household size was 2.75 and the average family size was 3.22.

In the county, the population was spread out, with 26.8% under the age of 18, 10.3% from 18 to 24, 30.7% from 25 to 44, 21.2% from 45 to 64, and 11.0% who were 65 years of age or older.  The median age was 34 years. For every 100 females, there were 111.0 males.  For every 100 females age 18 and over, there were 111.3 males.

The median income for a household in the county was $30,727, and the median income for a family was $36,793. Males had a median income of $29,407 versus $21,055 for females. The per capita income for the county was $14,161.  About 15.4% of families and 20.7% of the population were below the poverty line, including 26.3% of those under age 18 and 21.4% of those age 65 or over.

Law and government
Jasper County is governed by a five-member partisan county council, who are elected in staggered four year terms. The council appoints a county administrator who is tasked with running the day-to-day operations of the county, with the exception of the Sheriff's Office.

Mary Gordon Ellis, the first woman elected to the South Carolina legislature, represented Jasper County in the state senate for one term, from 1928 to 1932, after having served as state superintendent of schools.

Politics

Communities

City
 Hardeeville (largest city)

Town
 Ridgeland (county seat)

Unincorporated communities

 Coosawhatchie
 Gillisonville
 Grahamville
 Grays
 Levy
 Limehouse
 Okatie
 Old House
 Pineland
 Pocotaligo
 Point South
 Robertville
 Switzerland
 Tarboro
 Tillman
 Wagon Branch

See also
 List of counties in South Carolina
 National Register of Historic Places listings in Jasper County, South Carolina
 Jasper County Sheriff's Office (South Carolina)
 Jasper Ocean Terminal

References

External links

 
 
 Jasper County History and Images

 
1912 establishments in South Carolina
Hilton Head Island–Beaufort micropolitan area
Populated places established in 1912
Majority-minority counties in South Carolina